Centrosomal protein of 68 kDa is a protein that in humans is encoded by the CEP68 gene.
CEP68 is required for centrosome cohesion. It decorates fibres emanating from the proximal ends of centrioles. During mitosis, CEP68 dissociates from centrosomes. CEP68 and rootletin depend both on each other for centriole association, and both also require CEP250 for their function.

References

External links

Further reading 

 
 
 
 

Centrosome